Shacheng may refer to the following locations in China:

Shacheng, Fuding (沙埕镇), town in Fujian
Shacheng, Huailai County (沙城镇), town in Hebei
Shacheng railway station (沙城站), station on the Beijing–Baotou Railway near Zhangjiakou, Hebei
Shacheng Subdistrict (沙城街道), Longwan District, Wenzhou, Zhejiang